SS Keewatin is a passenger liner that once sailed between Port Arthur/Fort William (now Thunder Bay) on Lake Superior and Port McNicoll on Georgian Bay (Lake Huron) in Ontario, Canada. She carried passengers between these ports for the Canadian Pacific Railway's Great Lakes steamship service. Keewatin also carried packaged freight goods for the railway at these ports.

Description

The ship had 108 staterooms with berths for 288 passengers. The vessel was manned by 86 officers and crew.

Construction and career
Built by Fairfield Shipbuilding and Engineering Company in Govan, Glasgow, Scotland as yard number 453, Keewatin was launched on 6 July 1907 and completed in September. The vessel sailed on her maiden voyage docking at Lévis, Quebec to be halved because the canals below Lake Erie, specifically the Welland Canal could not handle ships as long as Keewatin. The ship was reassembled at Buffalo, New York, where she resumed her voyage under her own power to begin service at Owen Sound, Ontario.

Route
Keewatin was originally designed to complete the link in the Canadian Pacific Railway's continental route. She and Assiniaboia joined three others, Manitoba, Athabaska, and Alberta (the latter two also built in Scotland). She served this purpose by linking the Railroad's Owen Sound depot to Fort William Port Arthur on Lake Superior. In 1912 Port McNicoll, Ontario, was established as the new 'super port' and rail terminus and the ships moved there. The ships took two and a half days to make the trip each way, including half a day traversing the Soo Locks. Port McNicoll was known as the "Chicago of the North" until the trains and ships were discontinued in 1965 following the completion of the Trans Canada Highway through northern Ontario, causing the town to practically die, as all of the rail and ship jobs left.

In the last twenty years of her working life, like many passenger ships of that era on the Great Lakes, Keewatin and sister ship Assiniboia operated under stringent regulations imposed for wooden cabin steamships following the  disaster in 1949. Doomed by their wooden cabins and superstructure, these overnight cruisers lasted through the decline of the passenger trade on the lakes in the post-war years. As passengers opted for more reliable and faster modes of travel, Keewatin and her sister ship were withdrawn from the passenger trade in 1965, continuing in freight–only service until September 1967.

Keewatin ran nearly continuously until being retired on 29 November 1965. Soon after, she was acquired for historic preservation in the United States. Her sister ship, Assiniboia, was also set to be preserved as an attraction, but burned in 1971 and was scrapped.

Museum ship
After languishing for a few years, in January 1967 Keewatin was bought by West Michigan entrepreneur Roland J. Peterson Sr. for $37,000, $2,000 more than it would have sold for scrap. It arrived on the Kalamazoo River in Douglas, Michigan, on 27 June 1967. The ship was known as Keewatin Maritime Museum, permanently docked across the river from the summer retreat Saugatuck, Michigan, from 1968 until its relocation in 2012. Keewatin, manned with a crew of ten was towed back to Canada and arrived in Port McNicoll on 23 June 2012.

Relocation
In August 2011 it was announced that the vessel had been sold to Skyline International Developments Inc., and was moved back to its home port of Port McNicoll, Ontario, on 23 June 2012, for restoration and permanent display as a maritime museum and event facility. This was possible due to cooperation of the local and State officials in obtaining permissions and permits to dredge the harbor where Keewatin sat for 45 years to allow the ship to be moved. A not for profit foundation, the Diane and RJ Peterson Keewatin Foundation, was formed to operate the ship and restore her. Skyline Developments, a publicly held corporation that was rebuilding the  Port McNicoll site, funding the project.

Keewatin was moved from Kalamazoo Lake on 31 May 2012, and docked about  down river just inside the pier for continued maintenance before entering Lake Michigan. The vessel departed Saugatuck for the lake on 4 June 2012, to continue its journey northward to Mackinaw City. There Keewatin had a temporary layover before the final leg of the trip to Port McNicoll.

On 23 June 2012, a celebration marked Keewatins return and the rebirth of a new planned community surrounding her. It was 45 years after Keewatin left Port McNicoll on 23 June 1967 and 100 years after 12 May 1912, the date that the ship began working from the same dock.

In late 2017 plans were discussed to move Keewatin to Midland, Ontario. By March 2018 it became clear that Keewatin would remain in Port McNicoll for another summer pending further relocation options. In 2019, development company CIM committed to incorporating Keewatin into a redevelopment plan at the Port McNicoll site; the plans called for the ship to remain as a museum in a park adjacent to the proposed mixed-use (residential and commercial) development. But by June 2020, Skyline Investments (owner of Keewatin and surrounding development properties) indicated CIM had defaulted on mortgage payments, and would instead be pursuing plans to donate the ship to the Marine Museum of the Great Lakes in Kingston, Ontario. Local opposition to the relocation from Port McNicoll has been spirited, and the fate of Keewatin remains unclear.

In the Winter of 2023 the "Keewatin was donated to the Marine Museum of the Great Lakes in Kingston Ontario. The ship was donated to the museum by Skyline Investments, the museum has the proper expertise, facilities, and funding to properly restore, maintain, and preserve this unique piece of Canadian history.

She was also used extensively in the opening episode of Season Seven, "Murdoch Ahoy," of Murdoch Mysteries. A documentary has been broadcast on CBC Canada was also made called "Bring Her on Home".

References

External links
  Scottish Built Ships database (ss Keewatin)
 Official website
  Film "Bring Her on Home"

Passenger ships of Canada
Ships built on the River Clyde
Passenger ships of the Great Lakes
Ships of CP Ships
Steamships of Canada
Passenger ships of the United States
Museum ships in Canada
Museum ships in Ontario
Museums in Simcoe County
1907 ships
Ships and vessels on the National Archive of Historic Vessels